The following is a list of fictional astronauts exploring the inner Solar System.

Sun

Mercury

Venus

"Counter-Earth"

Mars

Notes

References

Lists of fictional astronauts